Dmitri Iosifovich Ivanovsky (alternative spelling Dmitrii or Dmitry Iwanowski; ; 28 October 1864 – 20 June 1920) was a Russian botanist, the co-discoverer of :viruses (1892) and one of the founders of virology.

Life
Ivanovsky was born in the village of Nizy, Gdov Uyezd. He studied at the University of Saint Petersburg under Andrei Famintsyn in 1887, when he was sent to Ukraine and Bessarabia to investigate a tobacco disease causing great damage to plantations located there at the time. Three years later, he was assigned to look into a similar disease occurrence of tobacco plants, this time raging in the Crimea region. He discovered that both incidents of disease were caused by an extremely minuscule infectious agent, capable of permeating porcelain Chamberland filters, something which bacteria could never do. He described his findings in an article (1892) and a dissertation (1902). Then he worked at the Imperial University of Warsaw and at Donskoy University in Rostov on Don.

In 1898, the Dutch microbiologist Martinus Beijerinck independently replicated Ivanovsky's experiments and became convinced that the filtered solution contained a new form of infectious agent, which he named virus. Beijerinck subsequently acknowledged Ivanovsky's priority of discovery.

Notes

References

Sources

External links 

1864 births
1920 deaths
Biologists from the Russian Empire
Saint Petersburg State University alumni
Russian virologists
Russian botanists